Nikole Alangia Mitchell (also spelled Nicole; born 5 June 1974) is a retired Jamaican sprinter who specialized in the 100 metres. She also competed on the successful Jamaican team in the 4 x 100 metres relay, winning an Olympic bronze medal in 1996.

In 1993, she  was awarded the Austin Sealy Trophy for the
most outstanding athlete of the 1993 CARIFTA Games.

Her personal best time for 100 metres was 11.18 seconds, achieved in July 1993 in Kingston. She attended St. Mary's high school and she was always the best athlete, doing well in the 100m and 200m.

International competitions

References

External links

Profile at Sports-Reference
Picture of Nikole Mitchell

1974 births
Living people
Jamaican female sprinters
Olympic athletes of Jamaica
Olympic bronze medalists for Jamaica
Athletes (track and field) at the 1996 Summer Olympics
World Athletics Championships athletes for Jamaica
World Athletics Championships medalists
Olympic bronze medalists in athletics (track and field)
Medalists at the 1996 Summer Olympics
Central American and Caribbean Games medalists in athletics
Olympic female sprinters
20th-century Jamaican women